Debra Hendricks Gibbs is an American attorney and politician serving as a member of the Mississippi House of Representatives from the 72nd district. She assumed office on October 14, 2016.

Early life and education 
Gibbs was born in Gulfport, Mississippi. She earned a Bachelor of Science degree in accounting from the University of Southern Mississippi, a Master of Business Administration from Mississippi College, and a Juris Doctor from the Mississippi College School of Law.

Career 
After earning her undergraduate degree, Gibbs worked for Entergy. From 1984 to 1989, Gibbs worked as the director of the Jackson State University Center of Development. From 1989 to 1996, she was the director of the Mississippi Department of Human Services for accounting and finance. After leaving government, Gibbs worked as an attorney. From 2010 to 2015, she was a member of the Mississippi Workers' Compensation Commission. Gibbs was then elected to the Mississippi House of Representatives and assumed office on October 14, 2016. Gibbs is the vice chair of the House Tourism Committee.

References 

Living people
People from Gulfport, Mississippi
Mississippi lawyers
Democratic Party members of the Mississippi House of Representatives
Women state legislators in Mississippi
African-American state legislators in Mississippi
University of Southern Mississippi alumni
Mississippi College alumni
Mississippi College School of Law alumni
Year of birth missing (living people)
21st-century African-American people
21st-century African-American women